Ardhapur is a town  and a municipal council in Nanded Subdivision of Nanded district in the Indian state of Maharashtra.  

The once little known place is now well-known for the rich crop Banana and its improved road connectivity. The name Ardhapur probably originated from the Sanskrit word Aradhyapur. There is one stone inscription at Ardhapur which is lying in a neglected state near Shiva temple states that some dynasty of the Rashtrakutas was also ruling over Degloor. There are many noticeable ancient sights such as Khaperkheda Shiva Temple, the stone inscription and Keshavraj Vishnu temple.

References

External links
 Ardhapur Nagar Panchayat
  
Cities and towns in Nanded district
Talukas in Maharashtra